The Biafo Glacier is a  long glacier situated in the Karakoram mountain range in Shigar district of Gilgit-Baltistan, Pakistan. One of the largest Karakoram glaciers, Biafo Glacier, flows south-east from the central Karakoram crest. Its basin covers an area of 853 km2, 628 km2 of which is permanent snow and ice, with the accumulation zone forming 68% of the glacier area.

Geography 
This highway of ice connects two ancient mountain kingdoms, Nagar in the west and Shigar District Baltistan in the east. The traverse uses 51 of the Biafo Glacier's  and all of the Hispar Glacier to form a  glacial route.

The Biafo Glacier presents a trekker with several days of strenuous boulder hopping, with views throughout and Snow Lake near the high point.

Campsites along the Biafo are located off the glacier, adjacent to the lateral moraines and steep mountainsides. The first three (heading up from the last village before the glacier, the thousand-year-old Askole village) are beautiful sites with flowing water nearby. Mango and Namla, the first two campsites, are often covered in flowers and Namla has an amazing waterfall very near the camping area. Baintha, the third campsite, is often used as a rest day. A large green meadow, it has a few running streams near the camp and many places to spend the day rock climbing or rappelling.

Evidence of wildlife can be seen on the trek, including Ibex and the Markhor mountain goat. The area is also known for Himalayan brown bears and snow leopards, although sightings are rare.

See also
 Baltoro Glacier
 Godwin-Austen Glacier
 Sarpo Laggo Glacier
 Azad Kashmir
 Eight-thousander
 List of highest mountains
 List of glaciers

References

External links
 Northern India detailed placemarks in Google Earth

Glaciers of the Karakoram
Glaciers of Gilgit-Baltistan